The Shadow Bureau is a musical collaboration between Nitzer Ebb’s Bon Harris and Jeehun Hwang, an award-winning  songwriter and video game, film, and TV composer. The duo is the main force behind the group with a rotating cast of guest collaborators to serve the project as needed by Harris and Hwang. In January 2011, Harris and Hwang were recruited by independent film company Indomina Media  to create a demo reel for several of the company's indie films. They were asked to create non-traditional soundtracks and this collaboration gave birth to The Shadow Bureau.

Single Releases 
The duo's first scored song, "Axis Of Envy" was for the martial arts film True Legend and featured the vocals of West End Girls singer Isabelle Erkendal and lyrics and vocals by Kraftwerk's Wolfgang Flür. The movie was released in the U.S. on May 13, 2011.

The Shadow Bureau's second release will be tied to Indomina's release of the Australian film Griff The Invisible in August 2011.  Griff stars True Blood's Ryan Kwanten as the movie's lead actor. The Shadow Bureau's song, "Don't Give Yourself Away," will be a part of the movie's soundtrack and features Curt Smith from the band Tears for Fears, and Linda Strawberry on vocals.

Guest Collaborators 

Adding to The Shadow Bureau’s mystique, Harris and Hwang act as the music’s curators as a revolving door of guest collaborators add their individual stamp to each composition. As a result, each composition evolves into its own unique creation while building a list of rumored collaborators.

Confirmed Collaborations 

 Wolfgang Flür of Kraftwerk
 Isabelle Erkendal of West End Girls
 Curt Smith of Tears For Fears

Rumored Collaborations 

 Devo's Mark Mothersbaugh

References

External links
 The Shadow Bureau Official Website
 The Shadow Bureau on Facebook

Collaborative projects
2011 in music